Stanley Wood (23 July 1905 – 17 February 1967) was an English footballer who played as an outside left. During his professional career he represented West Bromwich Albion and Halifax Town.

Career 

Wood was born in Winsford, Cheshire and attended Meadow Bank School in Winsford Village. As a youth he played football for Whitegate Victoria and Winsford United, before turning professional with West Bromwich Albion in April 1928. He made his Albion debut in September of the same year, in a Division Two match against Notts County. He went on to make 281 appearances for the club, scoring 66 goals, and was part of the Albion side that won promotion to the First Division in 1930–31 and beat Birmingham 2–1 in the 1931 FA Cup Final.

In May 1938 Wood joined Halifax Town on a free transfer and represented them throughout the Second World War as well as appearing as a guest player for Huddersfield Town in 1941–42. He served as Halifax's trainer from 1946 to 1949. Wood died in Halifax on 17 February 1967.

References 

 

1905 births
1967 deaths
People from Winsford
English footballers
Association football wingers
West Bromwich Albion F.C. players
Halifax Town A.F.C. players
English Football League players
English Football League representative players
Sportspeople from Cheshire
FA Cup Final players